MGM Grand Adventures Theme Park was a theme park adjacent to the MGM Grand hotel and casino in Paradise, Nevada, United States. It operated from 1993 to 2002.

The original plan for the theme park was to make it family-oriented by providing activities for children. The overall Wizard of Oz theming of the hotel and casino provided the motto to literally "follow the yellow brick road" from inside the hotel to the entrance to the theme park, which was built on the hotel's backlot. Opened on December 18, 1993, along with the rest of the complex, the then  MGM Grand Adventures Theme Park looked like a smaller version of Disney's Hollywood Studios and Universal Studios Florida in Orlando, Florida, which utilized a film studio-backlot theme.

For 2001, the theme park was renamed The Park at MGM Grand and served as a rental facility for corporate functions before being closed permanently in 2002. Since 2006, the property has been occupied by The Signature at MGM Grand.

History
MGM Grand Adventures opened on 33 acres of land on December 18, 1993. From 1994 to 1997, the park was renamed Scream Park each October for Halloween. This separate admission event included several haunted houses in and around the park's attractions.

In May 1996, the MGM Grand planned an $8 million reconfiguration of the park, which had performed below expectations. The plan included relocating and lengthening its roller coaster. In June and July 1996, MGM Grand Adventures offered "Bustin' Loose" summer block parties, in which the park was converted into three separately themed areas with live entertainment and interactive games. In May 1997, a pool, spa, and a 380,000 square-foot conference center were being built on 15 acres of land previously occupied by a portion of MGM Grand Adventures, reducing the park to 18.8 acres.

Additions and improvements were being made to the theme park in June 1997. In 1998, MGM Grand Adventures switched to a seasonal operation, with the park usually re-opening in April and continuing operations through the summer. In July 2000, MGM Mirage reviewed the park's land for possible alternative uses, despite being pleased with its performance. The park closed on September 4, 2000. At the end of the month, MGM Mirage began putting all of the park's rides and attractions up for sale through a California amusement park equipment broker, while cautioning that the park could re-open in spring 2001 if the equipment could not be sold for an adequate price.

In February 2001, MGM Mirage announced plans to rename MGM Grand Adventures as The Park at MGM. The park would only be open for group business and special events with 50 or more people, with general admission tickets no longer being issued.
The park retained three rides, a 900-seat amphitheater, and two 750-seat theaters. Keeping the park open for special events was used to generate income while still considering other options for the land, including the development of timeshares, luxury condominiums, entertainment complexes or additional casino and hotel space.

The park permanently closed in 2002, after a Jimmy Buffett "Parrothead" private party on Memorial Day. According to the Las Vegas Sun, the park "flopped because it lacked any exciting rides," and suffered from low attendance because of expensive ticket prices. The Las Vegas Review-Journal opined that the park "failed to take into consideration that a third of its visitors come from California where theme parks are ubiquitous and always racing to unveil the latest in thrill rides." On December 5, 2002, MGM Mirage announced plans to build a luxury condominium and hotel complex on the site of the closed theme park. MGM Grand Adventures was replaced by The Signature at MGM Grand.

Changes
Over the years, the park saw several changes. It opened with expensive ticket prices, by 1993 standards, with an admission charge of $25 for adults that were not guests of the hotel. Over time this fee was reduced in order to better match the caliber of attractions in the park and to increase attendance. By 1995, entry was $15 and $18 for the Halloween Scream Park.

Promotions such as summer nighttime concerts and spring break events were done to draw more crowds with additional attractions such as bungee runs and bounce houses added for those events.

Riders were strapped into harnesses and lifted up a  "launch tower" where they then pulled a ripcord setting into motion a 100-foot free fall upwards of 70 mph (110 km/h). It was placed over a lagoon that had once been home to a large faux steamboat (a snack bar was its only resident). As of 2000, it was billed as the world's largest sky coaster. The result was a very tall structure that could be seen from anywhere in the park. At night, it was lighted in the same green color as the hotel tower providing an impressive visual.

Over time the line-up of attractions changed, especially with the expansion of the hotel's pool and convention facilities. These changes also meant the entrance to the park was drastically changed and now involved a lengthy walk from the hotel, making the park seem like a separate entity.

The 40% reduction in area of the park entailed the removal of the Backlot River Tour, Deep Earth Exploration, and Manhattan Theatre. Although unaffected by the layout change, The Haunted Mine was also closed.

The Lightning Bolt was initially an indoor roller coaster. In 1997, it had been relocated outdoors to the northern end of the park, to a former special event space in the northwest corner. The ride was later expanded by Arrow Dynamics to include a second , and an extended run over the Grand Canyon Rapids.

For a short time, other smaller temporary flat-rides called the park home including a Chance Rides Zipper, Ferris Wheel, and Chaos. None of these attractions stayed very long but did help increase the attractions count.

Another addition to the park came in the form of "Kiddie Island." This was an island created in the lagoon near the base of Sky Screamer. It was home to a variety of small attractions such as a paddle boat river, Red Baron airplane ride, and Carousel.

Original attractions
MGM Grand Adventures Theme Park was built around a movie studio theme and provided for somewhat of a Disney-type experience. It had several themed areas, including Casablanca Plaza, New York Street, Asian Village, French Street, Salem Waterfront, Tumbleweed Gulch, Rio Grande Cantina, New Orleans Street, and Olde England Street. The park's characters were mostly cartoon characters such as King Looey and various others.

There were ten major rides and attractions, eleven restaurants and fast food areas, and a dozen retail shops. The original attractions line-up included:

 Backlot River Tour - A mix between Jungle Cruise at Disney Parks and Universal Studios Hollywood's Studio Tour, in which passengers embarked on a tour via a large boat that passed mock-ups of movie sets with special effects such as gun fire, rain, and water cannons. The queue was the longest in the park and featured additional information on special effects.
 Deep Earth Exploration - This ride opened shortly after the park due to technology challenges. It was the first attraction of its kind to incorporate a traditional 3-D movie dark ride with a motion simulator. Passengers boarded faux deep earth tunneling machines on a journey to the center of the earth (not to be confused with the Jules Verne novel and Tokyo DisneySea attraction of the same name), guided by an animatronic robot pilot (voiced by actor Matt Cates). The ride involved a number of stops where windows on the vehicle would open allowing the occupants to look out at special effects along the route.
 Lightning Bolt - An indoor, space-themed roller coaster with a top speed of 35 mph. In 1997, the roller coaster was moved outdoors, and was made to be twice as long.
 The Haunted Mine - A traditional dark ride where passengers boarded ore cars on a trip into an abandoned mining operation.
 Grand Canyon Rapids - A white water rapids raft ride with special effects such as an old west gun fight and a tunnel explosion.
 Parisian Taxis - bumper cars on the streets of Paris.
 Pirates' Cove - A 950-seat outdoor theater complete with a pirate ship and lagoon that were home to the "Dueling Pirates Stunt Spectacular".
 Magic Screen Theatre - Indoor theater that hosted a variety of shows including BMX Grind, a stunt show featuring BMX and in-line skating. It opened with 2 shows; blacklight puppet show called Kaleidoscope and a live recreation of The Three Stooges.
 King Looey Theatre (later Manhattan Theatre) - Indoor theater that hosted a variety of shows, including an ice skating spectacle starring King Looey.
 You're in the Movies (later Gold Rush Theatre) - Indoor theater that hosted a variety of shows.

Characters
 King Looey was the child friendly version of the Leo the Lion mascot. King Looey wore a black tuxedo with a red bow and a golden crown.

References

External links
 John Katsilometes reminisces with Wayne Brady about MGM theme park by the Las Vegas Sun
 Group-Only Adventures by Meeting News

Defunct amusement parks in the United States
Amusement parks in Nevada
Buildings and structures in Paradise, Nevada
1993 establishments in Nevada
2002 disestablishments in Nevada
Amusement parks opened in 1993
Amusement parks closed in 2002
MGM Grand Las Vegas